Fernández is a Spanish patronymic surname meaning "son of Fernando". The Germanic name Ferdinand that it derives from (Gothic: Frið-nanð) means "brave traveler." The Portuguese version of this surname is Fernandes. The Arabized version is Ibn Faranda and it was used by the Mozarabs and Muwallads in Al-Andalus. Fernández was on the list of Officers and Sailors in the First Voyage of Columbus. The name is  popular in Spanish speaking countries and former colonies. The Anglicization of this surname is Fernandez.

People

 Adrián Fernández (born 1965), Mexican race car driver
 Adriana Fernández (born 1971), Mexican long-distance runner
 Alberto Fernández (disambiguation)
 Alejandro Fernández (disambiguation)
 Alexander Fernandez (disambiguation)
 Almudena Fernández (born 1977), Spanish fashion model
 Anaelys Fernández (born 1979), Cuban discus thrower
 Aníbal Fernández (born 1957), Argentine politician and Interior Minister
 Arran Fernandez (born 1995), English home-educated mathematics prodigy
 Augusto Fernández (born 1986), Argentine football player
 Bel Pozueta Fernández (born 1965), Basque politician
 Carlos Fernández (disambiguation)
 Carlos Ignacio Fernández Lobbe (born 1974), Argentine rugby union player
 Clarisa Fernández (born 1981), Argentine tennis player
 Clotilde González de Fernández (1880-1935), Argentine educator, writer
 Cristina Fernández de Kirchner (born 1953), Argentine politician and President of Argentina
 Dalixia Fernández (born 1977), Cuban beach volleyball player
 Douglas Fernández (born 1959), Venezuelan decathlete
 David Negrete Fernández (born 1883), Mexican colonel
 Emilio Fernández (1904–1986), Mexican actor, screenwriter and director
 Enrique Fernández Arbós (1863–1939), Spanish composer
 Enzo Fernández (born 1995), French-Spanish football player
 Federico Fernández (disambiguation)
 Félix Omar Fernández (born 1976), Puerto Rican track and field athlete
 Fernando Fernández Escribano (born 1979), Spanish footballer
 Florentino Fernández (actor) (born 1972), Spanish actor, comedian and showman
 Florentino Fernández (boxer) (1936–2013), Cuban boxer
 Freddy Fernández (actor), "El Pichi", (1934–1995), Mexican actor
 Freddy Fernández (footballer) (born 1974), Costa Rican footballer
 Gabriel Fernández (disambiguation)
 Gastón Fernández (born 1983), Argentine football player
 Gerardo Fernández (born 1977), Argentine cyclist
 Geovane Fernández (born 1982), Uruguayan cyclist
 German Fernandez (born 1990), American middle-distance runner
 Gigi Fernández (born 1964), Puerto Rican tennis player
 Giselle Fernández (born 1961), American television journalist
 Gregorio Fernández (1576–1636), Spanish sculptor
 Happy Fernandez (1939–2013), American politician
 Hendrik Fernandez (1932–2014), Indonesian politician
 Ignacio Fernández (born 1990), Argentine footballer
 Isabel Fernández (born 1980), Bolivian journalist
 Isabel Fernández (judoka) (born 1972), Spanish judoka
 Jacqueline Fernandez (born 1985), Sri Lankan actress and model
 Jérôme Fernandez (born 1977), French handball player
 José Ignacio "Nacho" Fernández (born 1990), Spanish international footballer
 José María Aierdi Fernández de Barrena (born 1958), Basque politician
 Juan Martín Fernández Lobbe (born 1981), Argentine rugby player
 Julián Fernández (disambiguation)
 Julie Fernandez (born 1974), British actress
 Junior Fernández (born 1997), Dominican baseball player
 Juris or Julie Iris Fernandez (born 1978), Filipino singer and songwriter
 Julie Fernandez-Fernandez (born 1972), Belgian politician
 Katherine Fernandez Rundle (born 1950), American politician
 Khotan Fernandez (born 1973), Mexican actor and artist
 Krystal Fernandez (born 1971), American sports journalist
 Lara Fernandez (born 1996), Spanish kickboxer
 Laura Fernandez (born 1960), Spanish-born Canadian illustrator
 Laura Fernández Piña (born 1971), Mexican politician
 Leonel Fernández (born 1953), Dominican politician and President of the Dominican Republic
 Leylah Annie Fernandez (born 2002), Canadian tennis player
 Lisa Fernandez (born 1971), American softball player
 Luis Fernández (born 1959), Spanish-born French football manager
 Macedonio Fernández (1874–1952), Argentine writer, philosopher and humorist
 Manny Fernandez (American football) (born 1946), American football player
 Manny Fernandez (wrestler) (born 1954), American wrestler
 Manny Fernandez (ice hockey) (born 1974), Canadian ice hockey player
 Manuel J. Fernandez (1925–1980), American military pilot and ace in the Korean War
 Mariano Fernández (disambiguation)
 Mark Fernandez (born 1988), Canadian pair skater
 Mark Anthony Fernandez (born 1979), Filipino actor
 Mary Joe Fernández (born 1971), American tennis player
 Matías Fernández (born 1986), Chilean football player
 Matilde Fernández (born 1950), Spanish social feminist and politician
 Mervyn Fernandez (born 1959), American football player
 Nino Fernandez (born 1984), Indonesian actor
 Pablo Armando Fernández (1930–2021), Cuban poet and writer
 Peter Fernandez (1927-2010), American voice actor and writer
 Próspero Fernández Oreamuno (1834–1885), Costa Rican military officer and President of Costa Rica
 Pedro Fernández (born 1969), Mexican recording artist and actor
 Pops Fernandez (born 1966), Filipina singer and actress
 Rafael Fernández (disambiguation), several people
 René Fernández Apaza (1924–2013), Bolivian Roman Catholic archbishop
 Rosario Fernández (born 1955), Peruvian politician and Prime Minister of Peru
 Rowen Fernández (born 1978), South African football player
 Rudy Fernandez (actor) (1952–2008), Filipino actor
 Rudy Fernandez (triathlete) (1947–2022), Filipino triathlete and reality TV contestant
 Rudy Fernández (basketball) (born 1985), Spanish basketball player
 Serrana Fernández (born 1973), Uruguayan swimmer
 Shiloh Fernandez (born 1985), American actor
 Sid Fernandez (born 1962), American baseball player
 Stefanía Fernández (born 1990), Venezuelan model and 2009 Miss Universe
 Tomás Fernández (disambiguation), several people
 Tony Fernández (1962–2020), Dominican baseball player
 Vicente Fernández (1940–2021), Mexican singer, producer and actor
 Victoria Eugenia Fernández de Córdoba, 18th Duchess of Medinaceli (1917–2013), Spanish duchess
 Xandru Fernández (born 1970), Spanish writer in the Asturian language
 Zachary Fernandez (born 2001), Canadian soccer player

See also
 Fernandes
 Hernandes
 Hernández

References

External links
 genealogiadelparaguay.com
 history-world.org
 lapatilla.com

Spanish-language surnames
Surnames of Spanish origin
Patronymic surnames
Surnames from given names
Surnames of Uruguayan origin